Åshild Bruun-Gundersen (born 26 November 1986) is a Norwegian politician for the Progress Party. She was elected representative to the Storting from the constituency of Aust-Agder for the period 2017–2021.

Personal life
Bruun-Gundersen was born in Hisøy on 26 November 1986, a daughter of Folke Haugland and Else Haugland. She graduated as engineer from the University of Agder in 2010.

References

1986 births
Living people
Progress Party (Norway) politicians
Members of the Storting
Aust-Agder politicians
21st-century Norwegian politicians